Shah Shahidullah Faridi (né John Gilbert Lennard) (1915–1978) was a British Muslim Convert, born to a Christian family.

Life

He embraced Islam after reading "Kashf al-Mahjub" (The Unveiling of the Veiled), the classical  treatise on Sufism written by Ali ibn Uthman al-Hujwiri. Though having been born and raised in a wealthy English family he left his home in search of a Sufi shaikh. In India, he eventually met the Chishti Sabri shaikh, Syed Muhammad Zauqi Shah and pledged allegiance to him.

At forty years of age, the responsibilities of spiritual succession were entrusted to him. He lived in Karachi for about thirty years until he died on Ramdhan 17th in 1978.  

He wrote Inner Aspects of Faith. He also compiled Part Two of "Tarbiatul Ushaq" ("The Training of Divine Lovers"), Syed Mohammad Zauqi Shah, 1425/2004, pub. A.S.Nordeen, Kuala Lumpur, . A brief biography of his, published recently in Urdu called "Talash e Haqq rudad." by Ahmed Ghazali Shaheedi, printed by M. Naeem Hashmi, Saudabad Malir Colony Karachi.

Selected works

_ (1970) Everyday practice in Islam Sufi Publishers, Karachi, OCLC 246753, new edition (1979) Mahfil-e-Zauqia, Karachi, OCLC 12205889
_ (1976) Spirituality in religion OCLC 28858132
_ (1979) Inner aspects of faith Mehfil-e-Zauqia, Karachi, OCLC 7706353, new edition (1985) Nur Academy, Delhi, OCLC 59078626
_ (1981) Daglig praksis Da'wa,

References

External links
 Belief in God
 The Meaning of Tasawwuf
 The Inner Aspects of the Battles of the Prophet
 The Fallacies of Anti Hadith Arguments
 Moon over Medina - a Sufi Bookstore
 Odyssey of the Spirit - Muhammad Harun Riedinger

Faridi, Shah Shahidullah
Faridi, Shah Shahidullah
Chishti Order
Converts to Islam
British Sufis
20th-century Muslim scholars of Islam
British Sunni Muslims
British emigrants to Pakistan
People from Karachi
Pakistani people of British descent